Samuel Russell Flippen (September 30, 1969 – August 18, 2006) was an American man who was executed in North Carolina for murder. Flippen was sentenced to death for the February 1994 murder of Britnie Nichole Hutton; his 2-year-old stepdaughter. Since his execution, there have been concerns raised about his conviction and whether he may have been innocent. He was convicted based on circumstantial evidence, had no criminal record, and maintained his innocence to the end. Some people opposed his execution, including Britnie Hutton's biological father. Flippen remains the last person executed in North Carolina.

Incident
On the morning of February 12, 1994, Samuel Flippen's wife, Tina Gibson, left her home for work in Forsyth County, North Carolina. She left Flippen alone with her daughter; 2-year-old Britnie Nichole Hutton. About one hour later, Flippen called 911 to report that Hutton had fallen from her chair and was having trouble breathing. Medical personnel responded to the call and found Hutton, who looked pale and made gasping-type respirations. Less than an hour later, Hutton was pronounced dead at the North Carolina Baptist Hospital.

A forensic pathologist performed an autopsy on Hutton and observed injuries to her head, neck, chest, abdomen, and back. He stated that Hutton had died due to internal bleeding, caused by severe tearing of her liver and pancreas. He concluded that the injuries could not have been caused by a fall but instead had been caused by punches or blows to the abdomen. Flippen claimed that on the morning of Hutton's death, he had placed her in a high chair and had gone into another room. He reported hearing a loud noise and returned to discover that Hutton had fallen from the chair and was having difficulty breathing. He then called 911 for assistance.

Trial
Ultimately, Flippen was accused of beating Hutton to death after she would not stop crying. He was charged with first-degree murder. The state offered Flippen the chance to plea to the lesser charge of second-degree murder, which would have spared him from facing a death sentence. He refused, however.

On March 7, 1995, he was found guilty of the murder of Hutton and was sentenced to death. He was found guilty based on circumstantial evidence. In 1997, the North Carolina Supreme Court overturned his original death sentence and ordered a second jury to consider Flippen's lack of prior criminal convictions before returning a verdict. The second jury deliberated for more than six hours before recommending a death sentence. On May 23, 1997, Flippen was formally sentenced to death again.

At his trial, Gibson testified that Flippen was a violent husband. Prior to Hutton's death, Flippen had no criminal record and had not been in trouble with the law. Friends of his testified that he was a kind person and instead argued that Gibson was the more likely person to have beaten Hutton to death. Gibson was never considered a suspect and received no punishment. Gibson had reportedly left Hutton alone with Flippen on multiple occasions, despite testifying that he was a violent person. Flippen's lawyers also received a statement from a woman who had looked after Gibson's son in 1999. The statement said that the boy was severely bruised from a supposed beating.

Execution
On August 18, 2006, Flippen was executed via lethal injection at Central Prison in Raleigh, North Carolina. His last meal consisted of popcorn shrimp, hush puppies, french fries and a Coke. He made no official final statement. Flippen maintained his innocence to the end and throughout his time on death row.

Aftermath
As of 2023, Flippen remains the last person to be executed by the state of North Carolina, which has gone over fifteen years without an execution. Since Flippen's execution, there has been a de facto moratorium on the death penalty in North Carolina. It is now the longest gap between executions since capital punishment was banned in the state between 1962 and 1983.

In 2021, Britnie Hutton's biological father, John Hutton, started raising questions about whether Flippen had really killed his daughter. John Hutton's attorneys filed a motion asking a judge to order the Winston-Salem Police Department to hand over their investigative files from the 1994 murder case. In the motion, Hutton's attorneys pointed to the allegation that Tina Gibson had allegedly beat one of her other children years after the death of Britnie Hutton. John Hutton opposed Flippen's execution back in 2006.

See also
 Capital punishment in North Carolina
 Capital punishment in the United States
 List of most recent executions by jurisdiction
 List of people executed in North Carolina
 List of people executed in the United States in 2006

References

1969 births
2006 deaths
20th-century American criminals
21st-century executions by North Carolina
21st-century executions of American people
American male criminals
American people convicted of assault
American people executed for murder
Criminals from North Carolina
People convicted of murder by North Carolina
People executed by North Carolina by lethal injection
People executed for murder
People from Forsyth County, North Carolina